Sapp (also known as Chhikka), also spelled as Sap or Supp is a musical instrument native to Punjab. It is used with the folk dances Bhangra and Malwai Giddha.

Design and playing

It is made of wood with many X shaped small parts. It is played by expanding and collapsing with both hands. It makes a unique clapping sound.

See also

Kato
Folk Instruments of Punjab

References

Punjabi music
Folk instruments of Punjab